L. Dolliver M. Nelson (27 June 1932 – 18 July 2016) was a Grenadian jurist. He was born in Sauteurs, Grenada. He received his BA from the University of the West Indies and further education at the London School of Economics. He served as the Vice President of the International Tribunal for the Law of the Sea from 1999 to 2002 and later its President from 2002 to 2005. He had also been a national justice in his native Grenada and served as a presiding arbiter for the Permanent Court of Arbitration.

References 

1932 births
2016 deaths
Grenadian judges
International Tribunal for the Law of the Sea judges
Alumni of the London School of Economics
University of the West Indies alumni
People from Saint Patrick Parish, Grenada
Grenadian judges of United Nations courts and tribunals